Wasel may refer to:

 Johannes Wasel (born 1991), German skier
 Wasel, Alberta, a locality in Canada

See also

Al Wasl SC, a multi-sports club in Dubai